The United States House of Representatives elections in California, 1998 was an election for California's delegation to the United States House of Representatives, which occurred as part of the general election of the House of Representatives on November 3, 1998. Democrats gained the 1st district but lost the 3rd and 36th (which they would gain back in 2000) districts for a net loss of one seat.

This was the last time until a special election in 2020 where a Republican flipped a Democrat-held U.S. House seat in California, and also the last time until 2020 that Republicans flipped a Democrat-held seat in a general election.

Overview

Separate elections 

Three special elections were held apart from those in November.  The elected winners would serve the remainder of the incumbent Congress and face re-election in November.

Results
Final results from the Secretary of State of California:

District 1

District 2

District 3

District 4

District 5

District 6

District 7

District 8

District 9

District 10

District 11

District 12

District 13

District 14

District 15

District 16

District 17

District 18

District 19

District 20

District 21

District 22

District 23

District 24

District 25

District 26

District 27

District 28

District 29

District 30

District 31

District 32

District 33

District 34

District 35

District 36

District 37

District 38

District 39

District 40

District 41

District 42

District 43

District 44

District 45

District 46

District 47

District 48

District 49

District 50

District 51

District 52

See also
106th United States Congress
Political party strength in California
Political party strength in U.S. states
1998 United States House of Representatives elections

References
1998 General Election Returns for United States Congress
California Elections Page

External links
California Legislative District Maps (1911-Present)
RAND California Election Returns: District Definitions

1998
United States House of Representatives
California